Tate Sequoya Farris (born May 13, 1996), known professionally as Baby Tate (formerly known as Yung Baby Tate), is an American rapper, singer, songwriter and record producer. The daughter of singer Dionne Farris, she released her debut project, ROYGBIV, in 2015. She has since garnered significant attention for the successful viral single "I Am" featuring Flo Milli and the EP After the Rain, among others. Her song "Beckham" was featured in the pilot episode of Euphoria in 2019. In 2021, she signed a record deal with Warner Records and released her major label debut single, "Pedi", on October 29, 2021.

Early life
Tate Sequoya Farris was born on May 13, 1996, in Atlanta, Georgia, to singers Dionne Farris and David Ryan Harris. She had little contact with her father while growing up, but her mother supported her musical ambitions. She started dancing and playing piano at an early age, and began producing her own beats by age 13.

Career
Under the name Yung Baby Tate, she released the EP ROYGBIV in November 2015 and the Christmas-themed EP YBTXMAS in December 2016. In early 2019, she released a short film produced in conjunction with her upcoming album. Her debut full-length album Girls was released in February 2019 to positive reviews. XXL named the album as one of the best hip-hop projects of 2019.

In July 2019, Yung Baby Tate released a cover of Nicki Minaj's "Megatron". In 2020, she announced that she had signed a recording contract with Issa Rae's record label Raedio and released two singles from the soundtrack of the television series Insecure. On April 30, 2020, the single "Damn Daniel" was released in collaboration with British rapper Bree Runway. On December 4, 2020, she released her sixth EP, After the Rain which included the singles "Rainbow Cadillac" and "I Am" featuring Flo Milli. A deluxe edition was released on May 21, 2021, and was preceded by the single "Eenie Meenie". She simplified her stage name to Baby Tate in late 2021.

Artistry
Baby Tate has been noted for the positive sexual messages in her lyrics. She lists Nicki Minaj, Migos, Future, Gucci Mane, CeCe Peniston, and her mother Dionne Farris as influences.

Discography

 Girls (2019)

References

External links

 
 

1996 births
Living people
African-American women rappers
American hip hop singers
People from DeKalb County, Georgia
Rappers from Atlanta
Songwriters from Georgia (U.S. state)
21st-century American rappers
21st-century African-American musicians
21st-century African-American women singers
African-American women singer-songwriters
American contemporary R&B singers
Southern hip hop musicians
21st-century women rappers